Distance geometry is the  branch of mathematics concerned with characterizing and studying sets of points based only on given values of the distances between pairs of points. More abstractly, it is the study of semimetric spaces and the isometric transformations between them. In this view, it can be considered as a subject within general topology.

Historically, the first result in distance geometry is Heron's formula in 1st century AD. The modern theory began in 19th century with work by Arthur Cayley, followed by more extensive developments in the 20th century by Karl Menger and others.

Distance geometry problems arise whenever one needs to infer the shape of a configuration of points (relative positions) from the distances between them, such as in biology, sensor network, surveying, navigation, cartography, and physics.

Introduction and definitions 
The concepts of distance geometry will first be explained by describing two particular problems.

First problem: hyperbolic navigation 
Consider three ground radio stations A, B, C, whose locations are known. A radio receiver is at an unknown location.

Second problem: dimension reduction
In data analysis, one is often given a list of data represented as vectors , and one needs to find out whether they lie within a low-dimensional affine subspace. A low-dimensional representation of data has many advantages, such as saving storage space, computation time, and giving better insight into data.

Definitions 
Now we formalize some definitions that naturally arise from considering our problems.

Semimetric space 
This defines a semimetric space: a metric space without triangle inequality.

Explicitly, we define a semimetric space as a nonempty set  equipped with a semimetric  such that, for all ,

 Positivity:    if and only if  .
 Symmetry: .

Any metric space is a fortiori a semimetric space. In particular, the -dimensional Euclidean space, is the canonical metric space in distance geometry.

The triangle inequality is omitted in the definition, because we do not want to enforce more constraints on the distances  than the mere requirement that they be positive.

In practice, semimetric spaces naturally arise from inaccurate measurements.

Isometric embedding 

For example, given the finite semimetric space  defined above, an isometric embedding into  is defined by points , such that  for all .

Affine independence 

In general, when , they are affinely independent, since a generic n-simplex is nondegenerate. For example, 3 points in the plane, in general, are not collinear, because the triangle they span does not degenerate into a line segment. Similarly, 4 points in space, in general, are not coplanar, because the tetrahedron they span does not degenerate into a flat triangle.

When , they must be affinely dependent. This can be seen by noting that any -simplex that can fit inside  must be "flat".

Cayley–Menger determinants

Cayley–Menger determinants, named after Arthur Cayley and Karl Menger, are determinants of matrices of distances between sets of points.

Let  be n + 1 points in a semimetric space, their Cayley–Menger determinant is defined by

 

It can be shown that the n-dimensional volume of the simplex  satisfies

 

 are affinely independent iff , that is, . Thus Cayley–Menger determinants give a computational way to prove affine independence.

If , then the points must be affinely dependent, thus .

History 
The first result in distance geometry is Heron's formula, from 1st century AD, which gives the area of a triangle from the distances between its 3 vertices. Brahmagupta's formula, from 7th century AD, generalizes it to cyclic quadrilaterals. Tartaglia, from 16th century AD, generalized it to give the volume of tetrahedron from the distances between its 4 vertices.

The modern theory of distance geometry began with Arthur Cayley and Karl Menger. Cayley published the Cayley determinant in 1841, which is a special case of the general Cayley–Menger determinant. Menger proved in 1928 a characterization theorem of all semimetric spaces that are isometrically embeddable in the n-dimensional Euclidean space . In 1931, Menger used distance relations to give an axiomatic treatment of Euclidean geometry.

Leonard Blumenthal's book gives a general overview for distance geometry at the graduate level, a large part of which is treated in English for the first time when it was published.

Menger characterization theorem 

Characterization via Cayley–Menger determinants 
The following results are proved in Blumethal's book.

Embedding  points in  

The converse also holds. That is, if for all ,

then such an embedding exists.

Such  is unique if and only if , that is,  are affinely independent.

Embedding  and  points 
That is, .

The converse also holds. That is, if for all ,

 

and

 

then such an embedding exists.

 For all , ;

Embedding arbitrarily many points 
The  case turns out to be sufficient in general.

Further, if , then it cannot be isometrically embedded in any .

Applications

There are many applications of distance geometry.

In telecommunication networks such as GPS, the positions of some sensors are known (which are called anchors) and some of the distances between sensors are also known: the problem is to identify the positions for all sensors. Hyperbolic navigation is one pre-GPS technology that uses distance geometry for locating ships based on the time it takes for signals to reach anchors.

There are many applications in chemistry. Techniques such as NMR can measure distances between pairs of atoms of a given molecule, and the problem is to infer the 3-dimensional shape of the molecule from those distances.

Some software packages for applications are:

DGSOL. Solves large distance geometry problems in macromolecular modeling.
Xplor-NIH. Based on X-PLOR, to determine the structure of molecules based on data from NMR experiments. It solves distance geometry problems with heuristic methods (such as simulated annealing) and local search methods (such as conjugate gradient minimization).
TINKER. Molecular modeling and design. It can solve distance geometry problems.
SNLSDPclique. MATLAB code for locating sensors in a sensor network based on the distances between the sensors.

See also
 Euclidean distance matrix
 Multidimensional scaling (a statistical technique used when distances are measured with random errors)
 Metric space
 Tartaglia's formula
 Triangulation
 Trilateration

References 

Metric geometry
Determinants